Mike Martir (born February 8, 1981) is a former professional Canadian football quarterback. He was signed by the Winnipeg Blue Bombers as an undrafted free agent in 2008. He played college football for the Rice Owls.

Early years
Martir was born in Mission Viejo, CA and raised in San Diego, CA. He was a standout football and baseball player at Sweetwater High School in National City, California.

College career
Martir transferred to Rice University as a signal-caller from 2003-2005.

Semi-professional career
Martir played one season with the defunct Los Angeles Monarchs of the California Football Association for one season in 2001. In 2007 Martir returned to football after being signed by the Tri-County Titans of the LaBelle Community Football League, Martir began the season on the injured list with an elbow injury and would start 4 games later that year. He was limited to holding duties in their final game of the year after suffering a leg injury.

Professional career

Winnipeg Blue Bombers
Martir's negotiating rights were acquired by the Winnipeg Blue Bombers in June, 2008. Martir then was signed in July. Midway through the season, Martir was sidelined with a moderate knee sprain. Martir played in two games and went 6 of 9 for 72 yards. Martir was released by the Bombers on September 1, 2008.

References

External links
Winnipeg Blue Bombers bio

1981 births
Living people
Sportspeople from Mission Viejo, California
Canadian football quarterbacks
Winnipeg Blue Bombers players
Rice Owls football players